A guanylate cyclase activator (or "GUCA") is one of group of proteins which upregulates guanylate cyclase. It is also known as guanylate cyclase-activating protein, with the abbreviation "GCAP". Mutations can be associated with vision defects.

There are five genes involved: 
 ,

References

External links
 

Proteins